Gmina Świętajno may refer to either of the following rural administrative districts in Warmian-Masurian Voivodeship in north-eastern Poland:
Gmina Świętajno, Olecko County
Gmina Świętajno, Szczytno County